Nikita Yevgenyevich Andreyev (born 22 September 1988) is a former Russian footballer who played as a striker.

Club career

Early career
Andreyev began playing football for his hometown PSK (Sports School Paemurru) in 1995 and FC Narva in 2002 -2005, before leaving for Ajax Lasnamäe in early 2005. He scored 29 goals in 32 league appearances in his debut Esiliiga season, becoming the league's top-scorer by an incredible 10 goal margin. After a positive end to the season in which Ajax Lasnamäe finished third, they won the play-off against Kuressaare over two legs, and were promoted to the Meistriliiga. However, promotion was not enough for Andreyev, and a transfer to local rivals Levadia Tallinn soon followed in the 2005 close season.

Levadia Tallinn

2006 season
After his transfer from Ajax Lasnamäe, Andreyev played 5 games during Levadia's UEFA Cup run, knocking out Finnish side Haka and Dutch club FC Twente, before falling to Newcastle United in the first round. Andreyev's only goal during the run was the opening goal in the first leg of Levadia's second qualifying round tie against FC Twente on 10 August 2006.

He finished his debut season for Levadia with 17 goals in 27 league games.

2007 season
He played two games for CSKA Moscow at the 2007 CIS Cup while on trial at the club, however he failed to convince head coach Valery Gazzaev to offer him a permanent contract, and he returned to Levadia. Andreyev finished the 2007 season with 13 goals in 19 league appearances.

2008 season
He played both games of the 2008–09 UEFA Champions League first qualifying round for Levadia Tallinn, though they failed to beat Irish team Drogheda United over two legs, losing 3–1 on aggregate. In the 2008 season, Andreyev managed his best ever Meistriliiga goal tally, scoring 22 goals in 30 appearances and finishing as second-top scorer.

2009 season
Andreyev scored 17 league goals in 17 appearances for Levadia in the 2009 season, before transferring to Tercera División club Almería B in August 2009.

Almería B
After transferring from Levadia during the 2009–10 La Liga pre-season, Andreyev was given the number 19 jersey for his new club.

In 2011–12, after the new signings for Almería B, Andreev was moved back to "juvenil" team.

In the end of 2011, his contract with Almería was rescinded.

FC Tyumen
In 2012, he signed a contract with Russian Second Division club FC Tyumen. Andreev would later make a handful of Russian National Football League appearances with FC Sokol Saratov and FC Tambov.

Intercity
In January 2020, he returned to Spain, joining Tercera División club Intercity.

International career
After persistently turning down offers to play for the Estonian football team, Andreyev represented the Russian under-19 team at the 2007 UEFA Under-19 Championship in Austria, though they failed to win a match, and crashed out of the tournament in the group stages.

Personal life
Andreyev stated in an interview with UEFA.com in July 2009 that he is a patriotic Russian, that he dreams of playing in the Russian league and is a Zenit fan. He also spoke of his commitment to football, stating "I love playing football, no matter where; in the yard, on the beach. I have not lost my desire – it has become even stronger."

Honours

Levadia Tallinn
Meistriliiga (3): 2006, 2007, 2008
Estonian Cup (1): 2006–07

Individual
 Esiliiga Top Scorer: 2005
 Meistriliiga Young Footballer of the Season: 2006

References

External links
Profile at Soccerway

Delfi interview

1988 births
Sportspeople from Narva
Living people
Esiliiga players
Meistriliiga players
FCI Levadia Tallinn players
UD Almería B players
Segunda División B players
Tercera División players
Russian First League players
Russian Second League players
Association football forwards
Russian footballers
Russia youth international footballers
Russian expatriate footballers
Expatriate footballers in Estonia
Expatriate footballers in Spain
FC Tyumen players
FC Sokol Saratov players
FC Tambov players
CF Intercity players